Lewisville is an unincorporated community in the northeast corner of Harrison Township, Owen County, in the U.S. state of Indiana. It lies near the intersection of County Road 700 East (a.k.a. Drunkards Pike) and West Lewisville Road, which is a community about twenty miles northeast of the city of Spencer, the county seat.  Its elevation is 771 feet (235 m), and it is located at  (39.4711579 -86.6319463). This community lies on the border of Owen County and Morgan County.

History
The community was named in honor of a family of early settlers.

Geography
 The Shenandoah Flying Field Airport is about five miles directly south of this community, and it is located on County Road 700 East (a.k.a. Drunkards Pike) just south of Watson Circle on the west bank of Butler Creek at  (39.4155586 -86.6351400).
 The Ellis Lake Dam is about three miles directly south of this community, and it is located on Ellis Lake Road, just west of County Road 700 East (a.k.a. Drunkards Pike) at  (39.4400466 -86.6400021).

School districts
 Spencer-Owen Community Schools, including a high school.

Political districts
 State House District 46
 State Senate District 39

References

External links
 Roadside Thoughts for Lewisville, Indiana

Unincorporated communities in Morgan County, Indiana
Unincorporated communities in Owen County, Indiana
Unincorporated communities in Indiana
Bloomington metropolitan area, Indiana